Fusilier Wipf (German: Füsilier Wipf) is a 1938 Swiss drama film directed by Hermann Haller and Leopold Lindtberg and starring Paul Hubschmid, Heinrich Gretler and Robert Trösch. When the First World War breaks out, a hairdresser's assistant in neutral Switzerland is mobilised for border protection duty. Serving in the army, he grows from a boy into a man and develops a greater love for his country. The film was part of the intellectual spiritual defence of Switzerland during the era as the country maintained a neutral stance in the years leading up to the Second World War, which began a year after the film was released.

Cast
  Paul Hubschmid - Reinhold Wipf 
 Heinrich Gretler  Leu 
 Robert Trösch - Meisterhans 
 Zarli Carigiet - Schatzli 
 Max Werner Lenz - Hungerbühler 
 Karl Meier - Gmür 
 Walter Bölsterli - Füsilier 
 Paul Ruffy - Füsilier 
 Sigfrit Steiner - Oberleutnant 
 Arnold Müdespacher - Korporal Hotz 
 Emil Hegetschweiler - Coiffeur Wiederkehr 
 Fanny Kaegi - Frau Wiederkehr 
 Elsie Attenhofer - Rosa Wiederkehr 
 Lisa della Casa - Vreneli 
 Wolfgang Heinz - Kriegsgefangener 
 Alfred Rasser - Notar 
 Erwin Kalser - Herr Godax
 Ludwig Donath - Kriegsgefangener

Bibliography
 Bergfelder, Tim & Bock, Hans-Michael. ''The Concise Cinegraph: Encyclopedia of German. Berghahn Books, 2009.

External links

1938 films
Swiss drama films
Swiss German-language films
Films directed by Hermann Haller
Films directed by Leopold Lindtberg
Films set in Switzerland
Films set in the 1910s
Films shot in Switzerland
1938 drama films
Swiss black-and-white films